Mansur is a rural locality (a settlement) in Tatarobashmakovsky Selsoviet, Privolzhsky District, Astrakhan Oblast, Russia. The population was 138 as of 2010. There are 4 streets.

Geography 
Mansur is located 34 km southwest of Nachalovo (the district's administrative centre) by road. Assadulayevo is the nearest rural locality.

References 

Rural localities in Privolzhsky District, Astrakhan Oblast